This is a list of Christian Colleges and Universities in India:

Albertian Institute of Management
 Amala Institute of Medical Sciences
 Andhra Loyola College
Andhra Loyola Institute of Engineering and Technology
Arul Anandar College, Karumathur
 Assam Don Bosco University
 Assumption College, Changanasserry
 Bankura Christian College
 Baselios Poulose Second College
 Berchmans Institute of Management Studies
 Bharata Mata College
 Bishop Agniswamy College of Education
 Bishop Heber College
Bishop Moore College
BPC College Piravom
 Catholicate College Pathanamthitta
 Christ Church College, Kanpur
 Christ College, Irinjalakuda
 Christ Junior College
 Christ University
Christian Medical College & Hospital
 Christian Medical College, Ludhiana
CMS College Kottayam
CSI College of Engineering
CSI Institute of Technology
 De Paul Institute of Science & Technology
 Devagiri College, Kozhikode
Don Bosco College, Tura
 Don Bosco Community College, Dindigul
 Don Bosco Institute of Technology, Mumbai
 Eastern Christian College, Dimapur
 Father Muller Medical College
 Fatima Mata National College
 Fr. Conceicao Rodrigues College of Engineering
• Gossner College, Ranchi
Henry Baker College
Higher and Technical Institute of Mizoram
Hindustan Institute of Technology and Science
Hislop College
Holy Cross College, Agartala
 Holy Cross College, Tiruchirapalli
 Idhaya Engineering College for Women
 Japfü Christian College, Nagaland
 Jesus and Mary College
 Jnana-Deepa Vidyapeeth
 Jubilee Mission Medical College and Research Institute
 Jyothi Engineering College, Cheruthuruthy, Thrissur
 Jyoti Nivas College, Bangalore
Karunya University
 Kodaikanal Christian College
 Loyola College of Education, Chennai
Loyola College of Social Sciences
Loyola College, Chennai
Loyola College, Mettala
Loyola Degree College, Manvi
Loyola Institute of Business Administration
Loyola Institute of Technology and Science, Thovalai
Loyola Technical Institute, Madurai
Loyola-ICAM College of Engineering and Technology
 Little Flower College
 Little Flower Junior College
 Loreto College, Kolkata
 Madras Christian College
 Malabar Christian College
 Malankara Catholic College, Mariagiri
 Malankara Orthodox Syrian Church Medical College, Kolenchery
 Mar Athanasios College for Advanced Studies, Tiruvalla
 Mar Athanasius College of Engineering
 Mar Baselios College of Engineering and Technology
 Mar Baselios Institute of Technology, Anchal
Mar Gregorios College Punnapra
 Mar Ivanios College
 Mar Theophilos Training College, Trivandrum
Mar Thoma College
 Marian College Kuttikkanam
 Martin Luther Christian University
 Mary Matha Arts & Science College
 Model Christian College, Kohima
 Morning Star College
 Mount Carmel College, Bangalore
 Mount Zion College of Engineering and Technology
 Navajyothi College Kannikkalam
 Nesamony Memorial Christian College
 Newman College, Thodupuzha
 Nirmala College, Muvattupuzha
 Nirmala College, Ranchi
 Nirmala College for Women
 Nirmalagiri College
 North Bengal St. Xavier's College
North East Adventist University, Meghalaya
Northeast Adventist College, Meghalaya
 Pazhassi Raja College, Pulpally, Bathery
 Pope John Paul II College of Education
 Pushpagiri Medical College
 Sacred Heart College Chalakudy
 Sacred Heart College, Thevara
 Sacred Heart HSS Thiruvambady
 Sahrdaya College of Engineering and Technology
 Saint Paul's College, Goa
 Salesian College, Darjeeling
 Sam Higginbottom University of Agriculture, Technology and Sciences
 Sarah Tucker College
Sarvodaya Vidyalaya, Trivandrum
 Sathyabama University
 Scottish Church College 
 Scott Christian College
 Senate of Serampore College (University)
 Sophia College for Women
Spicer Adventist University, Pune
 Stella Maris College, Chennai
St. Agnes PU College, Mangalore
 St. Albert's College
 St. Aloysius College (Mangalore)
 St. Aloysius College, Thrissur
 St. Andrew’s College of Arts, Science and Commerce
 St. Berchmans College
 St Claret College, Ziro
St. Dominic's College
 St. Dominic's College
 St. Edmund's College, Shillong
 St Francis College for Women
 St. Francis Institute of Management and Research
St. John's College, Agra
 St John's College, Anchal
 St. John's Medical College
 St. Joseph's College, Bangalore
 St. Joseph's Evening College, Bangalore
 St. Joseph's College of Commerce
 St Joseph College of Communication
St Joseph's College, Darjeeling
 St. Joseph's College, Hassan
 St. Joseph's College, Jakhama
St. Joseph's College, Moolamattom
St. Joseph's College, Tiruchirappalli
St. Joseph's College for Women, Alappuzha
St. Joseph's College of Engineering and Technology, Palai
St. Joseph's College, Irinjalakuda
 St. Joseph's Institute of Management
St. Joseph's Institute of Management, Bangalore
St. Mary's College, Hyderabad
 St. Mary's College, Thrissur
 St. Paul's Cathedral Mission College
 St. Pius X College, Rajapuram
 St. Stephen's College, Delhi
St. Teresa's College
 St. Thomas College of Teacher Education, Pala
St. Thomas College, Kozhencherry
 St. Thomas College, Palai
 St. Thomas College, Thrissur
 St. Vincent College of Commerce
 St. Vincent D E Paul Degree College
St. Xavier's College, Ahmedabad
St. Xavier's College, Burdwan
 St. Xavier's College, Dumka
 St. Xaviers College, Jaipur
 St. Xavier's College, Kolkata
St. Xavier's College, Mumbai
 St. Xavier's College, Nevta
 St. Xavier's College of Education
 St. Xavier's College of Education, Hindupur
 St. Xavier's College of Engineering
 St. Xavier's College, Palayamkottai
 St. Xavier's College, Patna
 St. Xavier's College, Ranchi
 St. Xavier's College, Simdega
 St. Xavier's College, Thumba
St. Xavier's Institute of Education
 St. Xavier's Technical Institute
 The American College, Madurai
Voorhees College (India)
 Vimal Jyothi Engineering College
Vimala College
 Wilson College, Mumbai
 Women's Christian College, Chennai
 Women's Christian College, Kolkata
Xavier Institute of Social Service
 Xavier Institute of Business Administration
 Xavier Institute of Development Action and Studies
 Xavier Institute of Engineering
 Xavier Institute of Management & Research
 Xavier Institute of Management, Bhubaneswar
 Xavier University, Bhubaneswar
 Xavier University Bhubaneswar
 XLRI - Xavier School of Management

Lists of universities and colleges in India
Lists of Christian universities and colleges